The Hyderabad women's cricket team is a women's cricket team that represents the Indian city of Hyderabad. The team competes in the Women's Senior One Day Trophy and the Women's Senior T20 Trophy.

Current squad

Doli Ramya
Keerthi Reddy
Gongadi Trisha
Mamatha Kanojia
Anuradha Nayak
Mahesh Kavya
Himani Yadav
Rachna Kumar
Madiwala Mamatha (wk)
Soppadhandi Yashasri
Bhogi Shravani

Honours
 Women's Senior One Day Trophy:
 Runners-up (1): 2011–12
 Women's Senior T20 Trophy:
 Runners-up (3): 2012–13, 2013–14, 2016–17

See also
 Hyderabad cricket team

References

Women's cricket teams in India
Cricket in Hyderabad, India
Cricket in Telangana